Sujit Lenka (born 14 December 1992) is an Indian cricketer. He made his first-class debut for Odisha in the 2013–14 Ranji Trophy on 14 December 2013.

References

External links
 

1992 births
Living people
Indian cricketers
Odisha cricketers
Sportspeople from Bhubaneswar
Cricketers from Odisha